House of Talhosten (also referred to as Talustan or Talustand) is a Circassian princely house of Kabardia of Circassia. They are found in Kabardino-Balkaria, Russian Federation; as well as in Republic of Turkey due to the Circassian Genocide.

Notable members

Flags

Images

References

Circassian houses